Kappa Delta Rho, commonly known as KDR, is an American college social fraternity, with 84 chapters (35 of which are active) spread out over the United States, primarily in the Midwest and Mid-Atlantic regions. Kappa Delta Rho's open motto is "Honor Super Omnia", or "Honor Above All Things".

History

Founding and development
Kappa Delta Rho was founded in room 14 of Old Painter Hall at Middlebury College in Middlebury, Vermont on May 17, 1905. Middlebury was the site of chapters of three fraternities that year: Chi Psi, Delta Kappa Epsilon, and Delta Upsilon. However, not finding these organizations to their liking, the founders of the fraternity chose to create their own new organization. Kappa Delta Rho was the creation of a group of men from the Middlebury Commons Club by ten principal founders:  George Edwin Kimball, Irving Thurston Coates, John Beecher, Pierce Wordsworth Darrow, Thomas Howard Bartley, Benjamin Edward Farr, Gideon Russell Norton, Gino Arturo Ratti, Chester Monroe Walch and Roy Dyer Wood.

In the fraternity's first year, founders Kimball, Walch and Ratti met by committee to draft the ritual, open motto, and a constitution. Walch created the fraternity's secret motto and password.  For its organizational structure, the founders chose Roman nomenclature for fraternity positions, evocative of Roman values. Ratti, who had previous artistic experience, designed the coat of arms and helped develop the ritual. He also chose the fraternity's colors and flower.

This activity was soon noticed by a representative from Delta Tau Delta fraternity, who met with the founding members to discuss absorption of KDR into DTD.  While the founders indeed had expressed some interest in joining a national fraternity, the debate soon turned against this idea. In Kimball's words: "We had decided that we preferred to paddle our own canoe and took no further action in the matter." Yet the idea of national expansion took root, and by 1913, KDR had established its second chapter, Beta, at Cornell, and soon after, its third chapter, Gamma, at SUNY Albany.

Growth
Kappa Delta Rho became a Junior Member of the North American Interfraternity Conference (NIC) in 1921, and a Senior Member in 1929.

Growth continued after World War II, when chapters which had briefly ceased operations reopened to returning students, and expansion again became possible.  Similarly, after World War II, the fraternity successfully reopened to the flood of returning GIs fifteen of its then twenty chapters in the fall of 1946.

In 1960, the KDR Trust was formed, which marked the birth of today's KDR Foundation, an educational, charitable and literary foundation.

KDR has allowed moderate expansion during most of its history, with several new chapters forming in each ensuing decade. The pace of chapter growth increased substantially in the 1980s and 1990s. For example, while the 1970s saw just two chapters formed, during the 1980s the fraternity gained 28 new chapters. All told, the fraternity has organized at more than 80 campuses, and from these boasts 35 active chapters and colonies. See the list of KDR chapters.

Co-educational pressure
Unusual among college fraternities, KDR's Alpha chapter at Middlebury chose to coeducate (go "co-ed") in 1989, due to a policy at the school against single-sex organizations.  Their choice was stark: either that, or disband, an unthinkable choice for the founding chapter of a national fraternity. After several years of negotiation, Alpha chapter was restored to its place as the eldest chapter of the fraternity and by agreement was the only chapter of the Kappa Delta Rho Society, a parallel branch of the fraternity meant to support this, its only co-ed chapter. Because of its special status, Alpha chapter maintained its own traditions and a unique badge, slightly modified from the standard fraternity badge, which ironically, Alpha men had designed at the 1905 birth of the fraternity. Alpha chapter was also the only nationally affiliated fraternity chapter at Middlebury, where all other groups remain "locals". On June 25, 2015, Middlebury College terminated its relationship with KDR.

Kappa Delta Rho is one of two fraternities (the other being Alpha Delta Phi) to have a co-ed chapter within the North American Interfraternity Conference.

Values
ΚΔΡ publications describe its values as: fellowship, leadership, scholarship, service, and tradition. Its credo was first nationally published in The Fraternity Month in October 1946. The author was George E. Shaw, Alpha '10, (1885–1976), director of Kappa Delta Rho and national historian.

Publications

Quill & Scroll
The National Office of the fraternity publishes a semi-annual news magazine called the Quill & Scroll. First published as The Scroll in 1909 at Middlebury College, the Fraternity changed the name in 1924 after it became a national publication. Today, articles in The Quill and Scroll detail the successes of the National Fraternity, the various alumni corporations, undergraduate chapters and individual members. The articles reflect the high ideals of KDR as experienced by its undergraduates and alumni.

Pathfinder
The Pathfinder is the KDR educational and historical manual. It is given to those who choose to pledge the fraternity so that they may understand the responsibilities of membership. It also provides them with an introduction to the way in which KDR is organized, how it operates and what the roles are of the chapter, alumni, and National Office. The Manual is updated every few years by the National Office to bring it up to date with new information, policies and ideas.

Awards
Awards are given out to chapters and individual Brothers each year at the National Convention. Chapter awards include the Robert D. Corrie Award for Chapter of The Year, O.D. Roberts Award for Chapter Improvement, Donald C. Wolfe for Outstanding Newsletter, George E. Kimball Award for Outstanding Social Service, John L. Blakely Award for Outstanding Philanthropics, Leo T. Wolford Award for Outstanding Campus Involvement, Gino A. Ratti Award for Outstanding Alumni Relations, E. Mayer Maloney Award for Outstanding Faculty Relations, Dr. Harold Osborn Award for Outstanding Intramural Sports, and the George E. Shaw Award for Outstanding Public Relations.

Individual awards are also handed out, including Outstanding Senior, Outstanding New Member, Outstanding Advisor, and the Red Rose Award. In addition, qualified Alumni may be inducted into the prestigious Ordo Honoris based upon achievements in either their career, community or their dedication to the fraternity.

Local chapter or individual member misconduct

In 2015, the KDR chapter at Pennsylvania State University was suspended for three years after a tip led to a police search warrant regarding their private Facebook page that showed naked women who appeared to be sleeping, passed out, or otherwise incapacitated, apparently without the subjects' consent.

At least 144 current KDR members and alumni were members of the private group. The group was titled "2.0" because an earlier version of the site had been taken down after a woman who saw a naked photo of herself threatened to report the group.

38 members of the fraternity were expelled and the former member of the fraternity who gave authorities the tip that led to the search warrant sued the fraternity for severe hazing he allegedly endured as a pledge.  While pledging he was allegedly burned with cigarettes, physically beaten by larger members, and forced to drink liquor mixed with urine and hot sauce.

Foundation
Kappa Delta Rho is financially supported through undergraduate dues and by the Kappa Delta Rho Foundation, a 501(c)(3) charity. The foundation raises funds from Brothers, family, and friends of KDR to financially support the educational, leadership, and character development programs undertaken by the national fraternity. The foundation also manages both individual and collective scholarship endowments of the national fraternity, providing more than $75,000 in academic support each year to qualified members of the fraternity.

Scholarships
The Kappa Delta Rho Foundation provides competitive scholarships based upon academic achievement. Applications are submitted online. The foundation also serves as caretaker to several chapter-specific scholarships and area of study-specific scholarships that can be applied for with the same application. The foundation typically gives away more than $75,000 in annual scholarships with individual awards ranging from a minimum of $500 upwards to $2,200.

In addition to competitive academic scholarships the foundation also gives away non-competitive New Member academic scholarships. Any KDR brother who received above a 3.0 GPA on a 4.0 scale during his pledging semester will receive $100 from the foundation, providing they submit the proper documentation.

The Kappa Delta Rho Foundation also offers scholarships for the Undergraduate Interfraternity Institute and Futures Quest, both of which are educational programs run by the North American Interfraternity Conference. The scholarships cover the full cost of registration for each program.

Programs
The Elmon M. Williams Leadership Academy is a multi-day leadership program that occurs each August (in conjunction with the National Convention in even-numbered years) and is funded in large part by the Foundation. The academy allows for undergraduate KDR brothers to learn more about being an effective leader in their chapter and in the professional world.

The Consuls Academy is a three-day leadership program held every January for incoming chapter consuls (presidents).  This intensive academy prepares consuls for the responsibilities of running a chapter.

In 2007 the KDR Foundation created the Kappa Delta Rho Wilderness Institute, which occurred once a year in a different wilderness location around the country. Brothers who were admitted to the program through an application process took part in a multi-day hike that was led by an alumni mentor and experienced guide. The program was designed to provide hands on leadership programming, substance-free brotherhood building activities, personal growth opportunities, and core values exploration.  The Wilderness Institute continued until 2011.

In 2014, KDR introduced a total member education program called The Legion.  This innovative four-year personal development track grounded in the Fraternity's values will combine the latest educational technology with a holistic personal development curriculum to mold brothers from the first day of new member education to preparing them for life after graduation.

Notable alumni

Business 
Nicholas M. Bonaddio, Tau '04 - CEO, numberFire and Chief Product Officer, FanDuel
Douglas Cifu, Nu Alpha '87 - CEO, Virtu Financial; vice chairman and alternate governor, Florida Panthers
Robert J. Sinclair, Rho '53 - President, Saab-Scania of America, Inc.
Colston E. Warne, Beta '20 - founder of Consumers Union; publisher of Consumer Reports magazine
Archibald C. West, Epsilon '36 - Vice President, Frito-Lay; creator of Doritos

Athletics 

C. Edward Ackerly, Beta '20 - 1920 Olympic Games gold medalist, wrestling
Steve Axman, Beta Alpha '69 - Indoor Football League and college football coach
John Cannady, Nu '47 - Pro Bowl NFL linebacker
Owen Dougherty, Zeta '51 - college football and baseball coach at IUP
Chuck Ealey, Pi Alpha Honorary - CFL football player and Grey Cup champion, holds NCAA record for consecutive wins by a quarterback
Milt Graham, Delta '56 - CFL and AFL football player
Jim Harbaugh, Mu '86 - former NFL quarterback, head football coach of the University of Michigan, former head football coach of the San Francisco 49ers, Stanford, and University of San Diego
Joe Hoague, Delta '41 - NFL football player; National High School Association Hall of Fame Coach
Jim LeClair, Beta Alpha '66 - NFL quarterback
Greg Manusky, Delta '88, former NFL linebacker and coach
Harold Osborn, Eta '22 - 1924 Olympic Games gold medalist, decathlon, high jump
Steve Rivera, Lambda '76 - All-American college and NFL wide receiver
Peter D. Rocca, Lambda '79 - Olympic silver medalist, Pan American Games gold medalist, swimming
Fran Rogel, Zeta '50 - Pro Bowl NFL fullback
Donald F. Yenko, Zeta '51 - race car driver; muscle car legend; creator of Yenko Camaro

Military and public service 
Eugene Louis Dodaro, Psi '73 - Comptroller General of the United States
Charles I. Carpenter, Iota '27 - Major General, Air Force Chaplain
Joseph B. McDevitt, Eta '40 - Rear Admiral, Judge Advocate General of the Navy
John S. Fisher, Iota Honorary - Governor of Pennsylvania 
Ari Fleischer, Alpha '82 - White House Press Secretary
Matt Urban, Beta '41 - Lieutenant Colonel, U.S. Army; Medal of Honor recipient

Chapters
Kappa Delta Rho has 84 chapters, 35 of which are active.

See also
List of social fraternities and sororities

External links
Official site
Kappa Delta Rho Foundation

References

 
1905 establishments in Vermont
North American Interfraternity Conference
Student societies in the United States
Student organizations established in 1905